The giant triplefin, Blennodon dorsale, is a triplefin of the family Tripterygiidae, the only member of the genus Blennodon, found around the coast of New Zealand.  It length is up to 15 cm, and it is the largest known triplefin species.

References

Tripterygiidae
Endemic marine fish of New Zealand
Taxa named by Frank Edward Clarke
Fish described in 1879